Woo Seung-Jae (born 26 July 1986; 우승재) is a male wrestler from South Korea.

External links
Profile

References

1986 births
Living people
South Korean male sport wrestlers
World Wrestling Championships medalists
21st-century South Korean people